Live from Aragon Ballroom is a live DVD concert of the band Widespread Panic, filmed at the Aragon Ballroom in Chicago, Illinois, on October 31, 2011.

Track listing

Disc one
 Pigeons
 Radio Child
 Wishbone
 True To My Nature
 Time Zones
 Love Tractor
 Degenerate
 Blight
 Tail Dragger
 Climb To Safety

Disc two
 Godzilla
 Iron Man
 Godzilla
 Imitation Leather Shoes
 Jack
 Surprise Valley
 Blue Indian

Disc three
 I'm Losing You
 Chilly Water
 Bust It Big
 Chilly Water
 Outta Mind (Outta Sight)
 Postcard
 Porch Song
 Werewolves of London

Personnel

Widespread Panic
John Bell — Vocals, Guitar
John "JoJo" Hermann — Keyboards, Vocal
Jimmy Herring - Guitar
Todd Nance — Drums, Vocals
Domingo S. Ortiz - Percussion, Vocals
Dave Schools - Bass, Vocals

Widespread Panic video albums
Live video albums